Strumigenys is a genus of ants in the subfamily Myrmicinae.

Biology
Strumigenys form small nests in soil, under or between rocks, or in and under logs or under cattle dung. Some species nest in association with other ants such as Bothriomyrmex mayri or Rhytidoponera metallica. Although they are normally slow moving, they can run quickly when disturbed.

S. xenos is a permanent social parasite, which forms no workers and lives in the nests of its host S. perplexa.

Most species specialize in the hunt of springtails, and the others eat other soft-bodied arthropods.

Distribution
Strumigenys is found throughout the tropics and subtropics. 18 species are known from Australia.

Selected species
The genus contains over 850 species. They include:

 Strumigenys abdera Fisher, 2000
 Strumigenys ayersthey Booher & Hoenle, 2021
 Strumigenys bryanti Wheeler, 1919
 Strumigenys emmae Emery, 1890
 Strumigenys formosensis Forel, 1912
 Strumigenys godeffroyi Mayr, 1866
 Strumigenys heteropha Bolton, 2000
 Strumigenys hirsuta Tang et al., 2019
 Strumigenys hispida Lin & Wu, 1996
 Strumigenys indagatrix Wheeler, 1919
 Strumigenys lacunosa Lin & Wu, 1996
 Strumigenys lanuginosa Wheeler, 1905
 Strumigenys lichiaensis Lin & Wu, 1996
 Strumigenys liukueiensis Terayama & Kubota, 1989
 Strumigenys mandibularis Smith, 1860
 Strumigenys minutula Terayama & Kubota, 1989
 Strumigenys nanzanensis Lin & Wu, 1996
 Strumigenys perplexa (Smith, 1876)
 Strumigenys solifontis Brown, 1949
 Strumigenys tenuipilis Emery, 1915
 Strumigenys tigris Brown, 1971
 Strumigenys trada Lin & Wu, 1996
 Strumigenys trinidadensis Wheeler, 1922
 Strumigenys wallacei Emery, 1897
 Strumigenys xenos Brown, 1955

See also
 List of Strumigenys species

Footnotes

References

 Smith, F. 1860. Descriptions of new genera and species of exotic Hymenoptera. Journal of Entomology 1: 65–84. PDF

External links

Myrmicinae
Ant genera
Taxa named by Frederick Smith (entomologist)
Taxonomy articles created by Polbot